Harri Blumén (born 4 February 1958) is a Finnish ski jumper. He competed in the normal hill and large hill events at the 1976 Winter Olympics.

References

1958 births
Living people
Finnish male ski jumpers
Olympic ski jumpers of Finland
Ski jumpers at the 1976 Winter Olympics
Sportspeople from Lahti